The Biyagama Water Treatment Plant or BWTP is a water treatment facility located at the bank of Kelani River, in Biyagama, Sri Lanka. The plant provides drinking water to approximately one million people, in Wattala, Ja-Ela, Kelaniya, Biyagama, Ragama, Kandana, Kadawatha, Kiribathgoda, Seeduwa and Ganemulla, within the Gampaha District.

Construction of the facility began on 22 October 2008. It was ceremonially inaugurated by President Mahinda Rajapakse on 22 July 2013. The facility uses raw water from the Kelani River. The maximum water loss during the purification process is 5%, due to raw water transmission, sludge de-watering and backwash.

Extension 
The expansion project is ongoing as of June 2019, by Maga Engineering and Suez.

References

External links 
 Facebook page
 

Water treatment facilities
Industrial buildings completed in 2013
Water supply and sanitation in Sri Lanka
2013 establishments in Sri Lanka
Buildings and structures in Gampaha District